The St. Bonaventure Bonnies men's soccer team is a varsity intercollegiate athletic team of St. Bonaventure University in Allegheny, New York, United States. The team is a member of the Atlantic 10 Conference, which is part of the National Collegiate Athletic Association's Division I. St. Bonaventure's first men's soccer team was fielded in 1961. The team plays its home games at McGraw-Jennings Field in neighboring Olean. The Bonnies are coached by Kwame Oduro.

The Bonnies have never won the Atlantic 10 Men's Soccer Tournament, the Atlantic-10 regular season, nor have ever qualified for the NCAA Division I Men's Soccer Championship. Their best regular season performance was their third-place finish in 1999. Their best Atlantic 10 Tournament performances came in 1999 and 2009, where the Bonnies reached the semifinal.

Rivalries 

The Bonnies primary rival is the Siena Saints, whom they compete with for the Franciscan Cup.

Seasons

Individual achievements

Top scorers 

Brad Wolf is St. Bonaventure's all-time points leader, while Joe Trabold is St. Bonaventure's all time goalscoring leader. Both players' careers overlapped during the 1984 and 1985 seasons.

Facilities

Marra Athletics Complex

Tom 80' and Michelle Marra Athletics Field Complex is a multisport complex with a 200-seat soccer-specific stadium that hosts both the men's and women's soccer programs. The Bonnies began playing at the facility in 2014. Previously St. Bonaventure played at McGraw-Jennings Field.

Coaching history 

St. Bonaventure University has had seven head coaches in their program's existence.

References

External links 

 

 
Men's soccer clubs in New York (state)
1961 establishments in New York (state)
Association football clubs established in 1961